Lewis of Sweden, also Louis - Swedish: Ludvig - may refer to:

Lewis Vasa or Ludvig Vasa, Prince of Sweden 1583, son of King Carl IX (died in infancy) 
Louis of Vasa, Swedish prince (claimant) 1832, son of Ex-Crown Prince Gustav (died in infancy)